The Belmont Building is an historic building in Victoria, British Columbia, Canada.  It is located on Government and Humboldt Streets, just to the north of the Fairmont Empress Hotel.

See also
 List of historic places in Victoria, British Columbia

References

External links
 

1912 establishments in Canada
Buildings and structures completed in 1912
Buildings and structures in Victoria, British Columbia